The year 570 BC was a year of the pre-Julian Roman calendar. In the Roman Empire, it was known as year 184 Ab urbe condita. The denomination 570 BC for this year has been used since the early medieval period, when the Anno Domini calendar era became the prevalent method in Europe for naming years.

Events
 Berlin Kore, from a cemetery at Keratea, near Athens, is begun. It is now at the Staatliche Museen zu Berlin, Germany.
 The Satrapy of Armenia is established as a province of the Achaemenid Empire. This is the first polity to bear the name Armenia.
 Francois Vase, black figure decoration on a volute crater, is made by Kleitias and Ergotimos (approximate date). It is now in a museum in Italy.
 Amasis II drives Apries from the throne of Egypt.

Births
 Xenophanes, Greek philosopher
 Pythagoras, Samian Greek philosopher and mathematician (approximate date)

Deaths
 Sappho, Greek lyric poet
 Ezekiel, Hebrew prophet

References